Watson-Sanders House is a historic home located near Smithfield, Johnston County, North Carolina.  It was built about 1820, and is a two-story, three bay, frame I-house dwelling.  It has a double engaged front piazza,
an original rear shed piazza.  The interior was remodeled in the Greek Revival style, when the house was moved to its present site in 1854.

It was listed on the National Register of Historic Places in 2001.

References

Houses on the National Register of Historic Places in North Carolina
Greek Revival houses in North Carolina
I-houses in North Carolina
Houses completed in 1820
Houses in Johnston County, North Carolina
National Register of Historic Places in Johnston County, North Carolina